"Crying, Waiting, Hoping" is a song written by Buddy Holly. It was released in 1959 as the B-side to "Peggy Sue Got Married". Three versions of Holly's recording were released: the 1959 commercial release, the 1964 reissue with different orchestration, and Holly's original, private home recording.

Recordings
The song was first recorded on December 14, 1958 by Holly (only himself with guitar) in apartment 4H of "The Brevoort", Fifth Avenue, Manhattan (many other sources say apartment 3B). After Holly's death on February 3, 1959, his home recordings of his last six compositions were turned over to record producer Jack Hansen. Hansen hired studio musicians and a backup vocal group, the Ray Charles Singers, to augment Holly's vocal and guitar. The idea was to match the established sound of Buddy Holly and the Crickets as closely as possible.

"Crying, Waiting, Hoping" is technically the most successful of the six overdubs; it turned out so well that it was originally intended as the "A" side of a 45-rpm single. Holly wrote and recorded the song with pauses ("Cryin'... waitin'... hopin'... you'll come back"). Hansen ingeniously turned the solo into call-and-response verses, so the backup singers fill in the pauses with an "echo" of each word. (For a German reissue of this song, the producer took the "echo" idea literally, and played the Hansen recording in an echo chamber.)

Hansen's studio version of "Crying, Waiting, Hoping" was recorded on June 30, 1959, at Coral Records' Studio A, along with "Peggy Sue Got Married". Both sides were released as Buddy Holly's first posthumous single. (The remaining four tunes on Holly's tape were re-recorded by Hansen and company in 1960. All six were issued on an album, The Buddy Holly Story, Vol. 2.)

Holly's manager, Norman Petty, recorded his own versions of the last six Holly originals in 1964, using his own studio facilities and backup group, The Fireballs. Petty's versions differ from Hansen's versions in that there are no background vocals, and the melodies have new surf-guitar arrangements added to them.

The Beatles version 
"Crying, Waiting, Hoping" was part of the Beatles' nightclub act during their formative years. It was a direct transcription of the 1959 Buddy Holly record. George Harrison sang the lead vocal and replicated studio guitarist Donald Arnone's instrumental bridge, note for note. The group performed the song during their failed Decca audition on January 1, 1962, with George Harrison on the lead vocal and Pete Best on drums.

The Beatles repeated the song on August 6, 1963, for the Pop Go The Beatles radio show. The BBC recording, which has been released commercially, features Ringo Starr on drums.

The Beatles never recorded the song during their heyday, but the group hadn't completely forgotten it. On January 29, 1969, between takes during a recording session, George Harrison began idly singing and playing "Crying, Waiting, Hoping." Paul McCartney and John Lennon jumped in immediately with their backing vocals, as they had in their early days, and Starr accompanied them. Harrison played the Donald Arnone bridge from memory.

Marshall Crenshaw version
American musician Marshall Crenshaw released a version of "Crying, Waiting, Hoping" for the 1987 film La Bamba. Marshall Crenshaw portrayed Buddy Holly in the movie; he is featured singing the song on what is supposed to be February 2, 1959, Buddy's final show before dying in the plane crash in the early hours of February 3, "The Day the Music Died". Crenshaw has frequently been compared to Holly throughout his career.

Initially, Crenshaw was skeptical of accepting the role of Holly in the film, but was impressed by the script; he recalled, "I thought [the script] was fantastic, really. [I told producer Terry Hackford,] 'I'm still uneasy about this, but even if I don't do it, I hope it comes together for you.

Crenshaw's version of "Crying, Waiting, Hoping" was produced by Garry Tallent. It was Tallent's idea to record the song. Crenshaw explained,

Other cover versions

Wreckless Eric covered the song in 1978 for his second album, The Wonderful World of Wreckless Eric.
Rockabilly supergroup The Head Cat, formed by vocalist Lemmy (of Motörhead), drummer Slim Jim Phantom (of The Stray Cats) and guitarist Danny B. Harvey (of Lonesome Spurs and The Rockats) covered this song for their 2006 album Fool's Paradise.
Chris Isaak contributed a cover version for the 2011 album Listen to Me: Buddy Holly.
Marty Stuart and his Fabulous Superlatives played the song live in 2013 on RFD-TV's The Marty Stuart Show.

References

Sources
Amburn, Ellis (1996). Buddy Holly: A Biography. St. Martin's Press. .
Bustard, Anne (2005). Buddy: The Story of Buddy Holly. Simon & Schuster. .
Dawson, Jim; Leigh, Spencer (1996). Memories of Buddy Holly. Big Nickel Publications. .
Gerron, Peggy Sue (2008). Whatever Happened to Peggy Sue?. Togi Entertainment. .
Goldrosen, John; Beecher, John (1996). Remembering Buddy: The Definitive Biography. New York: Da Capo Press. .
Goldrosen, John (1975). Buddy Holly: His Life and Music. Popular Press. 
Gribbin, John (2009). Not Fade Away: The Life and Music of Buddy Holly. London: Icon Books.

External links
Buddy Holly—The Complete Works.
Crying, Waiting, Hoping. The Beatles Bible.
The Cover Song List. 

1959 songs
The Beatles songs
Buddy Holly songs
Marshall Crenshaw songs
Music published by MPL Music Publishing
Song recordings produced by George Martin
Songs written by Buddy Holly
Songs released posthumously
1959 singles